Haren Buddila (born 2 June 1999) is a Sri Lankan cricketer. He made his List A debut on 14 December 2019, for Negombo Cricket Club in the 2019–20 Invitation Limited Over Tournament. Prior to his List A debut, he was named in Sri Lanka's squad for the 2018 Under-19 Cricket World Cup.

References

External links
 

1999 births
Living people
Sri Lankan cricketers
Negombo Cricket Club cricketers
Place of birth missing (living people)